Eudokia or Eudocia (Greek: Εύδοκία, c. 580 – 13 August 612), originally named Fabia, was a Greek woman who became Byzantine empress as the first wife of Heraclius from 610 to her death. She was a daughter of Rogas, a landowner in the Exarchate of Africa, according to Theophanes the Confessor.

Empress 
Her birth name was Fabia. She was betrothed to Heraclius when the future emperor still resided in the Exarchate. The Exarch at the time was her father-in-law Heraclius the Elder.

Heraclius had started a revolt against Phocas in 608. Under unknown circumstances both Fabia and her mother-in-law Epiphania seem to have been captured by Phocas by 610. They spent their captivity in the monastery "Nea Metanoia" (New Repentance) and were used as hostages to prevent Heraclius from besieging Constantinople. The two women were eventually released by members of the Green faction of Byzantine chariot racing events. They were delivered to Heraclius at the small island of Kalonymos in the Sea of Marmara, leaving him free to launch his successful assault. The Excubitors defected to his side and thus allowed him to enter the city without serious resistance. On 5 October 610, Heraclius was proclaimed Emperor and, on the same day, married Fabia. She took the name Eudokia and was granted the title of Augusta.

Death 
Eudokia died on 13 August 612. According to the Chronographikon syntomon of Ecumenical Patriarch Nikephoros I of Constantinople, the cause of death was epilepsy. According to Nikephoros, her funeral was accompanied with an incident revealing how popular she was with the general populace. A maidservant spat out of an upstairs window while the funeral procession was just below it. The coffin was still open, and the saliva reached the robes of the corpse. The crowds took offense and burned the girl alive.

Eudokia was buried in the Church of the Holy Apostles.  Heraclius went on to marry his niece Martina.

Children 
Eudokia and Heraclius had two children:
 Eudoxia Epiphania, a daughter. Born on 7 July 611. She was proclaimed Augusta on 4 October 612.
 Heraclius Constantine, a son, who went on to be Emperor Constantine III. Born on 3 May 612. Crowned co-emperor on 22 January 613.

See also

List of Roman and Byzantine empresses

External links 
An article on Fabia Eudokia by Lynda Garland

580 births
612 deaths
Heraclian dynasty
Burials at the Church of the Holy Apostles
6th-century Byzantine women
7th-century Byzantine empresses
Fabii
Heraclius
Neurological disease deaths in Turkey
Deaths from epilepsy
Royalty and nobility with disabilities
Mothers of Byzantine emperors